The Katoomba Falls is a segmented waterfall that is located close to Echo Point near  on the Kedumba River descending into the Jamison Valley located within the Blue Mountains National Park in the Blue Mountains region of New South Wales, Australia.

A tourist park with unpowered and powered camp sites and cabins is located near the head of the waterfall on Scenic Drive.

See also

List of waterfalls of New South Wales

References

External links
 

Waterfalls of the Blue Mountains
Segmented waterfalls